Lee Young-hee (born 28 July 1955) is a South Korean physicist. He is currently professor in physics and energy science at Sungkyunkwan University as a SKKU fellow. He is also director of the Center for Integrated Nanostructure Physics in the Institute for Basic Science (IBS). He has been a Clarivate Analytics Highly Cited Researcher in the cross-field category in 2018, 2019, and 2020.

Education
Lee received a B.S. in physics, Chonbuk National University in 1982. In 1986 he received his Ph.D. in physics at Kent State University on the subject of "Classical and Quantum Computer Simulation Studies: Molecular Dynamics of the Kerr Effect in CS2 and Green's Function MonteCarlo Calculation of the Electronic Correlation Energy in Atoms" which was advised by Michael A. Lee.

Career
 2012–Present: Director of Center for Integrated Nanostructure Physics, Institute for Basic Science
 2009–Present: Professor in energy science, Sungkyunkwan University
 2007–Present: Korean Academy of Science and Technology (KAST), fellow
 2001–Present: Professor in physics, Sungkyunkwan University, SKKU fellow
 1996–1997: Visiting professor in physics, Michigan State University, United States
 1993–1993: Visiting researcher, Zurich IBM Research Center, Switzerland
 1989–1990: Visiting professor in physics, Iowa State University Ames National Laboratory, United States
 1987–2001: Assistant Professor, full professor in physics, Chonbuk National University

Awards
 Nov. 2019: Kyung-Ahm Prize in Natural Science, Kyung-Ahm Education & Cultural Foundation
 May 2017: Einstein Award from Chinese Academy of Sciences
 May 2014: Award from ' The 23nd SUDANG Prize'
 December 2012: Grand Prize for Sungkyun Family (Educational Achievements Parts), Sungkyunkwan University
 December 2010: 100 representative researches in all the researches and development done during 2010 in Korea, Ministry of Education, Science and Technology
 October 2010: 100 representative research achievements in the R&D of Ministry of Education, Science and Technology
 May 2008 Presidential Award in Science and Education
 December 2007: Lee Hsun Research Award, IMR, Chinese Academy of Science, China
 April 2005: Nominated as "Representative Research achievement of BK21 (’01.03~’05.12)", "Modification of electronic structures of a arbonnanotube by hydrogen functionalization"
 May 1997: Award from Foundation of Korea Science and Technology for "The Best Paper in Physics " Fellowship and Nominations
 June 1997: Nominated as "Man of Jeonbuk National University" in Science in 50th Anniversary of Jeonbuk National University
 September 1999: Nominated for "Man of Jeollabuk-do Province", in Academia and Public press
 September 2004: First Fellow of Sungkyunkwan University
 April 2005: Science Award from Korean Physical Society
 September 2007: Fellow of Sungkyunkwan University

Sources
2013: 'Transferred wrinkled Al2O3 for highly stretchable and transparent graphene/carbon nanotube transistors', Nature Materials 12(5), 403-409 (May, 2013) - " KBS News 9 Boardcating/Mar.04,2013 "  
2012: 'Probing graphene grain boundaries with optical microscopy', Nature, 490(7419), 235-239 - " KBS News Boardcating " 
2011: "Transparent, Flexible graphene / CNT transistor and non-volitive memory devices" - Selected as a Highlight in Nano Letters(11, 1344)- Selected for Cover page in Advanced Materias (23, 1899)
2009: "Adaptive Logic Circuits with Doping-Free Ambipolar Carbon Nanotube Transistors" NanoLetters, 99(4), 1401 Highlighted by Nature Publishing Group, Asia Materials - Appeared in public newspapers (Asia Economy Daily, etnews, fnnews etc.)
2009: "Reduction-Controlled Viologen in Bisolvent as an Environmentally Stable n-Type Dopant for Carbon Nanotubes" J. Am. Chem. Soc. (131, 327), - Appeared in newspapers (MK, etnews etc.)
2008: Industrialization of A/CNT composites - SBS Moring Wide, MBN News - Appeared in newspapers (Chosun, etnews, Hankyung etc.)
2007: Superb electroreactive CNT clusters - Nano Letters, 7(8), 2178 - KBS News 1TV
2006: Nominated as "Representative research achievement in the Basic Research of Korea Science and Engineering Foundation " - Control of the Electronic  Structures of Carbon Nanotubes
2005: Separation of semiconducting carbon nanotubes by nitronium ions - J. Am. Chem. Soc., 127, 5196 - KBS 2TV News - Appeared in newspapers (Donga, Kookmin, etnews etc.)
2005: Selected as the best research outcome in "The Final Evaluation of National Research Laboratory of Korea Science and Engineering Foundation"
2002: Transforming metallic CNTs to semiconducting CNTs by atomic hydrogen - Selected as Advanced Materials(14, 1818), Inside Cover page - YTN News
2001: The best supercapacitor record using SWCNTs (180F/g) - Advanced Materials, 13, 497
2000: Vertically aligned carbon nanotubes by microwave PECVD - Applied Physics Letters, 76, 2367
1999: The world first development of CNT-FED in collaboration with Samsung - Applied Physics Letters, 75, 3129 (Citation : 1,046 ) - Nature News
1997: Proposing Scooter Motion of catalyst for SWCNT growth - Physical Review Letters, 78, 2393 (Citation : 267 )
1996: "Crystalline ropes of Metallic Carbon Nanotubes" - Science, 273, 483 (Citation : 3,838 ) Scientific Activities

Other activities
November 2009–Present: Associate Editor of European Physical Journal: Appl. Phys.
2000–Present: Associate Editor of Carbon Letters
2006–2010: Managing Editor of NANO
2009–2010: International Advisory Committee of Nanotube conference
2008–Present: Conference chair of SPIE conference (Carbon Nanotubes, Graphene, and Associated Devices III)
2012–Present: Conference chair of MRS Meeting 
2008–Present: Program Committee of IWEPNM
2010–Present: Materials Research Society Member
2009–Present: Program Committee of Korea Carbon Society 
2001–Present: The Korean Physical Society Fellow
2001–006: Associate Editor of Journal of Nanoscience and Nanotechnology

Representative papers
 Probing graphene grain boundaries with optical microscopy (Nature, 2012)
 Transferred wrinkled Al2O3 for highly stretchable and transparent graphene/carbon nanotube transistors (Nature Materials, 2013) 
 Small Hysteresis Nanocarbon-Based Integrated Circuits on Flexible and Transparent Plastic Substrate (Nano Letters, 2011)
 Adaptive Logic Circuits with Doping-Free Ambipolar Carbon Nanotube Transistors (NanoLetters, 2009)
 Synthesis of Large-Area Graphene Layers on Poly-Nickel Substrate by Chemical Vapor Deposition: Wrinkle Formation (Advanced Materials, 2009)

References

^Carbon Nanotube Research Laboratory : https://web.archive.org/web/20131111090652/http://wiz.skku.edu/nanotube/
^IBS Center for Integrated Nanostructure Physics: https://web.archive.org/web/20150215044214/http://www.ibs.re.kr/kr/research/nanostructure/nanostructure.jsp
^Present Director of Institute for Basic Science (IBS), Center for Integrated Nanostructure Physics http://www.ibs.re.kr/kr/news/pressRelease.jsp?mode=view&article_no=1205&board_wrapper=%2Fkr%2Fnews%2FpressRelease.jsp&pager.offset=40&board_no=24
^http://www.skku.edu/new_home/campus/skk_comm/news_view.jsp?mode=read&b_name=board_news&b_code=1&physical_num=22668&virtual_num=3&keyword=성균가족상&fields=board_subject&page_no=1
^Sang Hoon Chae, Woo Jong Yu, Jung Jun Bae, Dinh Loc Duong, David Perello, Hye Yun Jeong, Quang Huy Ta, Thuc Hue Ly, Quoc An Vu, Minhee Yun, Xiangfeng Duan, and Young Hee Lee 'Transferred wrinkled Al2O3 for highly stretchable and transparent graphene/carbon nanotube transistors', Nature Materials 12(5), 403-409 (May, 2013) http://www.nature.com/nmat/journal/v12/n5/full/nmat3572.html,  http://news.kbs.co.kr/news/NewsView.do?SEARCH_NEWS_CODE=2621997&&source=http://nanotube.skku.ac.kr/papers.html
^Dinh Loc Duong, Gang Hee Han, Seung Mi Lee, Fethullah Gunes, Eun Sung Kim, Sung Tae Kim, Heetae Kim, Quang Huy Ta, Kang Pyo So, Seok Jun Yoon, Seung Jin Chae1, Young Woo Jo, Min Ho Park, Sang Hoon Chae, Seong Chu Lim, Jae Young Choi and Young Hee Lee,'Probing graphene grain boundaries with optical microscopy', Nature, 490(7419), 235-239(Oct. 11, 2012) http://www.nature.com/nature/journal/v490/n7419/full/nature11562.html, http://news.kbs.co.kr/news/NewsView.do?SEARCH_NEWS_CODE=2546231&retRef=Y&source=http://nanotube.skku.ac.kr/papers.html
^Woo Jong Yu, Si Young Lee, Sang Hoon Chae, David Perello, Gang Hee Han, Minhee Yun and Young Hee Lee, 'Small Hysteresis Nanocarbon-Based Integrated Circuits on Flexible and Transparent Plastic Substrate', Nano Letters, 11(3), 1344-1350 (Mar. 9, 2011) http://pubs.acs.org/doi/abs/10.1021/nl104488z, http://nanotube.skku.ac.kr/data/paper/nanoletters_main_page(Woo%20Jong).JPG
^Woo Jong Yu, Sang Hoon Chae, Si Young Lee, Dinh Loc Duong, and Young Hee Lee, 'Ultra-Transparent, Flexible Single-walled Carbon Nanotube Non-volatile Memory Device with Oxygen-decorated Graphene Electrode', Advanced Materials, 23(16), 1889-1893 (Apr. 26, 2011) http://onlinelibrary.wiley.com/doi/10.1002/adma.201004444/abstract
^Woo Jong Yu, Un Jeong Kim, Bo Ram Kang, Il Ha Lee, Eun-Hong Lee and Young Hee Lee, 'Adaptive Logic Circuits with Doping-Free Ambipolar Carbon Nanotube Transistors',Nanoletters, 9(4), 1401-1405( APR.12, 2009) http://pubs.acs.org/doi/abs/10.1021/nl803066v, http://www.nature.com/am/journal/2009/200906/full/am2009158a.html
^Seung Jin Chae, Fethullah Gunes, Ki Kang Kim, Eun Sung Kim, Gang Hee Han, Soo Min Kim, Hyeon-Jin Shin, Seon-Mi Yoon, Jae-Young Choi, Min Ho Park, Cheol Woong Yang, Didier Pribat and Young Hee Lee, 'Synthesis of Large-Area Graphene Layers on Poly-Nickel Substrate by Chemical Vapor Deposition: Wrinkle Formation', ADVANCED MATERIALS, 21(22), 2328-2333 (Jun. 12. 2009) http://onlinelibrary.wiley.com/doi/10.1002/adma.200803016/abstract

Living people
People from Gimje
Kent State University alumni
Academic staff of Sungkyunkwan University
South Korean physicists
1955 births
Institute for Basic Science
Academic staff of Jeonbuk National University
Foreign members of the Chinese Academy of Sciences
Jeonbuk National University alumni